Kalaberia is a village in Bhagabanpur I CD block in Egra subdivision of Purba Medinipur district, West Bengal, India. It comes under the control of Bhagwanpur police station.

Demographics
As per 2011 Census of India Kalaberia had a total population of 3,276 of which 1,695 (52%) were males and 1,581 (48%) were females. Population below 6 years was 353. The total number of literates in Kalaberia was 2,756 (94.29% of the population over 6 years).

Economy
There are many banks: State Bank, Punjab Bank, BGVB etc.

Education
The education system is well developed. Many nursery and government primary schools are there: Kalaberia Old Primary School, Mahatma Gandhi Sishu Siksha Sadan. Secondary education is represented by Kalaberia Prasanna Kumar High School and Charabath Girls High School.

Culture
Many Hindu temples are located here such as the Lord Shiba Temple, Maa Shitala Mandir and others.

References

Villages in Purba Medinipur district